Dubăsari District, is an administrative subdivision of Transnistria, Moldova. It is located along the river Dniester, in the center of Transnsitria. Its seat is the city of Dubăsari. The district contains this city and 9 communes (a total of 21 localities, including small villages/hamlets):

In addition, the breakaway authorities control the village of Roghi of the Chişinău-controlled Molovata Nouă commune of Dubăsari District. According to the 2004 Census in Transnistria, the population of the sub-district is 36,734, and that of the village Roghi is 715. The exact ethnic composition is available only for the sum: 18,763 (50.1%) Moldovans, 10,594 (28.29%) Ukrainians, 7,125 (19.03%) Russians, 92 (0.25%) Gagauzians, 134 (0.36%) Bulgarians, 46 (0.12%) Roma, 46 (0.12%) Jews, 53 (0.14%) Poles, 185 (0.50%) Belarusians, 63 (0.17%) Germans, 126 (0.34%) Armenians, and 205 (0.56%) others and non-declared. The population of the village of Roghi is almost entirely Moldovan.

In 1990–1991, the city of Dubăsari and the surrounding area were occasionally the scene of incidents, which aimed to establish in Transnistria a government that would break away from Moldova. In the 1992 War of Transnistria the city and the surrounding area were a major scene of the fighting.

List of heads of the state administration of the Dubăsari District and the town of Dubăsari 
 Eduard Davidovich Kantselevich (~ 2013)
 Fedor Grigoriyevich Kovalev (22 October 2013 – )

References

External links 
 Site of city of Dubossary

 
Districts of Transnistria